Lesbian, gay, bisexual and transgender (LGBT) people in Morocco face legal challenges not experienced by non-LGBT residents. Both male and female same-sex sexual activity is illegal in Morocco. Moroccans of the LGBT community face many hardships in the country, as they have limited legal rights.

Law regarding same-sex sexual activity
Article 489 of the Penal Code of Morocco criminalises "lewd or unnatural acts with an individual of the same sex". Same-sex sexual activity is illegal in Morocco and can be punished with anything from three to five years' imprisonment and a fine of 1,200 dirhams. The Moroccan government uses the law as a way to police members of the LGBT+ community. When one is arrested in Morocco for a suspected homosexual act, their name is publicized, thus outing the individual before a trial takes place. The legal status of LGBT people living in Morocco stems largely from traditional Islamic morality, which views homosexuality and cross-dressing as signs of immorality.

In 2016, two girls were arrested in Marrakesh after one's cousin took a photo of them kissing. This sparked international outcry and the use of the hashtag #freethegirls. Their case was postponed until December 2016. In early December 2016, the two girls were acquitted.

A 2019 evaluation by the Parliamentary Assembly of the Council of Europe on its partnership with the Moroccan Parliament, called upon Morocco to stop enforcing sections of its criminal code that "criminalise sexual relations between adults of the same sex or between adults of different sexes who are not related by marriage" until their eventual repeal.

Government policy
None of the major or minor political parties have made public statements in favour of LGBT rights and no LGBT rights legislation has been enacted.  Government attitudes towards homosexuality tend to be in the interests of the protection of the tradition of the country, in keeping with the culture's traditional gender roles and religious mores. It has banned books on homosexuality and required schools to teach a curriculum that "emphasises...the danger and depravity of ‘unnatural acts’". On 21 March 2008, a statement issued by the Ministry of Interior reinforced the government's intention to "preserve citizens' ethics and defend our society against all irresponsible actions that mar our identity and culture".

In foreign policy, the government opposed the participation of an international gay and lesbian rights representative at the 2001 United Nations Conference on AIDS-HIV. They also opposed a United Nations joint statement condemning violence against LGBT people.

Recognition of same-sex relationships
There is no legal recognition of same-sex couples.

Discrimination protections
There is no law against discrimination or harassment on the basis of sexual orientation or gender identity in Morocco.

Gender identity and expression
Traditional cultural and religious mores tend to associate cross-dressing with homosexuality. Culturally, certain forms of cross-dressing have been tolerated in areas where women were not a part. The initial lack of female actors meant that the roles often went to men, who were generally assumed to be homosexual, but were shown a modicum of tolerance.

In the 1950s, the publicity surrounding French actress and entertainer Coccinelle helped to establish Casablanca as being a place where certain doctors were willing to perform sex change operations, albeit in clandestine circumstances.

Today, it is unclear whether this reputation still exists or what the current government policy is for transgender people. A Moroccan transgender woman named Randa did reportedly publish a book, although little is known about its contents or commercial success.

Conviction history
Moroccan public opinion towards the LGBT community is generally negative, in alignment with attitudes about LGBT rights in much of the Muslim world. The country has a male-dominated culture, a patriarchal society with traditional gender roles, that prefers a male and a female to get married and have children. The government has sporadically continued to enforce the laws on homosexuality with occasional public arrests carried out in routine fashion.

A court in Ksar el-Kebir, a small city about 120 kilometres south of Tangier, convicted six men on 10 December 2007 of violating article 489 of Morocco's penal code. However, according to the defendants' lawyers, the prosecution failed to present any evidence that the men actually had engaged in the prohibited conduct.

The men were sentenced to varying terms on 17 December 2007, after a video circulated online—including on YouTube—purporting to show a private party, allegedly including the men, taking place in Ksar el-Kebir on 18 November. Press reports claimed the party was a "gay marriage". Following the arrests, dozens of men and women marched through the streets of Ksar el-Kebir, denouncing the men's alleged actions and calling for their punishment.

In 2010, the government permitted openly gay singer Elton John to give a performance during the Mawazine Festival, despite objections from the Justice and Development Party, which was, at the time, the biggest opposition party in parliament. The festival was condoned by King Mohammed VI and was a part of the king's plans to create a more open and modern nation.

Abdellah Taïa and Rachid O., both successful writers, have written openly about gender roles and sexual identity in Morocco, but they do not reside in Morocco.  Beyond these writers, the government has tolerated the existence of one magazine for the gay community as well as one gay rights organization. The LGBT publication Mithly has been allowed to be discreetly distributed to adults in Morocco, although the government still will not grant the publication a distribution license and the magazine itself has to be made in neighboring Spain. In a similar sense, the government will not officially recognize the LGBT rights organization, Kif-Kif, but has allowed it to exist and co-sponsor some educational seminars.

In 2017, following the United Nations' Universal Periodic Review in Geneva, Mustafa Ramid, former Minister of Justice and Liberties in Abdelilah Benkirane's and Saadeddine Othmani's governments, called homosexuals "trash" in an interview. This was criticised by local human rights associations which together signed a petition addressed to the Prime Minister of Morocco Othmani to open an investigation of Minister Ramid "on his discriminatory and unconstitutional statements towards sexual minorities".

In the 2018-19 Arab Barometer survey, 21% of the Moroccan respondents said homosexuality is acceptable.

In April, 2020 the Human Rights Watch reported of a campaign of online harassment in Morocco where people would go on same-sex dating apps to out other users, and on April 24, the Moroccan national security stated that the police had opened a "preliminary investigation" for "incitement to hatred and discrimination".

In April 2020, the Moroccan transgender influencer Sofia Talouni, who lives in Turkey and is followed by more than 600,000 people on Instagram, launched a denunciation campaign to outrage Moroccan homosexuals, stating: "You will burn in hell ". She incited her subscribers to create false accounts on gay dating applications and to reveal the identity of those who are there on social networks. The act has been questioned, insofar as Sofia Talouni is herself from the LGBT community. According to sociologist Khalid Mouna, she “tries to make her group undergo the same family rupture by adopting the discourse and the codes of her own detractors. This individual, obviously mentally unstable, wishes to isolate young Moroccan homosexuals by breaking up their family unit”. The journalist Hicham Tahir indicates that he has received “a hundred testimonies from people who were victims or direct witnesses of this campaign”. Some landlords ejected their tenants, while one person allegedly committed suicide. Moroccan LGBT associations denounced the campaign as homophobic. Moroccan police launched a preliminary investigation for "incitement to hatred and discrimination". On May 13, Talouni released a video where she apologized for the campaign. Instagram nevertheless suspended her account.

In November 2022, a trans woman was violently beaten by a group of people in Tangier. Three minors and an adult were subsequently arrested in connection with the assault.

Advocacy for LGBT rights
Kif-Kif is the only organization to advocate on behalf of the LGBT community in Morocco and publishes the Mithly magazine in Spain.  Established in 2004, it has not been given legal recognition by the Department of the Interior, but it has been unofficially permitted to organize certain educational seminars.
Hajar Moutaouakil, a young Moroccan lesbian, posted a video on YouTube on human rights day calling for love and tolerance, but the video created controversy. She later posted her biography online.

Summary table

Further reading 

 Adolescent and Youth Reproductive Health in Morocco: Status, Issues, Policies, and Programs by Julia Beamish and Lina Tazi Abderrazik.
 Audacity in Adversity | LGBT Activism in the Middle East and North Africa
 Homosexuality in Morocco: Between cultural influences and life experience by Imane Kendili, Soumia Berrada, and Nadia Kadiri
 Human Rights Council, Resolution 27/32: Human rights, sexual orientation and gender identity, A/HRC/RES/27/32, 2 October 2014
 Morocco: The treatment of homosexuals, including protection offered by the state and the attitude of the population
 "Love is Not a Crime": Goals of the Gay Movement in Morocco by Isabella Pori

See also

 Abdellah Taïa
 Human rights in Morocco
 Human rights in Western Sahara—Morocco controls 80 percent of this disputed territory
 LGBT rights in Africa
 Rachid O.

References

Bibliography
 Puterbaugh, Geoff. Africa, North. Encyclopedia of Homosexuality. Dynes, Wayne R. (ed.), Garland Publishing, 1990. pp. 19–22.
  Patanè, Vincenzo.  Arabi e noi. DeriveApprodi, 2002.

External links
GayMaroc.net in English

 
Law of Morocco
Human rights in Morocco
Morocco
Politics of Morocco